Timocratica maturescens is a moth of the family Depressariidae. It is found in French Guiana, Colombia and Venezuela.

The wingspan is 42–50 mm. The forewings and hindwings are white, beneath suffused light ochreous yellowish except towards the dorsum, deeper yellow ochreous towards the costa and apex, around the apical edge more or less suffused fuscous. The hindwings beneath are suffused yellow ochreous towards the costa.

References

Moths described in 1925
Timocratica